The 2017–18 St. Francis Brooklyn Terriers men's basketball team represented St. Francis College during the 2017–18 NCAA Division I men's basketball season. The Terrier's home games were played at the Generoso Pope Athletic Complex. The team has been a member of the Northeast Conference since 1981. They were coached by Glenn Braica, who was in his eighth year at the helm of the Terriers. The Terriers finished the season 13–18, 10–8 in NEC play to finish in a tie for fourth place. As the No. 5 seed in the NEC tournament, they lost LIU Brooklyn in the quarterfinals.

Previous season
The Terriers finished the 2016–17 season 4–27, 2–16 in NEC play. It marked the first time since the 1993–94 season that the Terriers finished 10th in the NEC. It also represented the second consecutive losing season for the Terriers and the first season in Braica's tenure that the Terriers missed the NEC tournament.

Offseason
The Terriers had three freshman transfer from the program after only one year: Robert Montgomery Jr., Gianni Ford, and Jahmel Bodrick. All three played significant minutes last season; Ford, and Bodrick averaged 14.5 minutes per game, and Montgomery averaged 18.7 minutes per game.

The Terriers added two freshman guards, Jalen Jordan and Chauncey Hawkins, and a junior college transfer Milja Cosic. Jordan, a 6'3" guard, finished his high school career in 2016, averaging 17.5 points a game as a senior and scored over 1,000 career points. Hawkins, a 5'8" guard, earned first-team All-North Jersey honors this past season after averaging 19.2 points, 4.9 rebounds, 4.1 assists and 3.4 steals. Cosic, a 6'6" forward, will have three years of eligibility after playing one season at Frank Phillips College in Borger, Texas. Last season, Cosic played in only 15 games for the Plainsmen after suffering an early-season ankle injury, and averaged 6.9 points and 4.2 rebounds per game in 22.0 minutes per contest.

Departures

Incoming transfers

Class of 2017 signees

Preseason 
In a poll of league coaches at the NEC media day, the Terriers were picked to finish in last place.

Roster

Schedule and results

|-
!colspan=12 style=| Exhibition

    
|-
!colspan=12 style=| Non-conference regular season
  

  

|-
!colspan=12 style=| NEC regular season

  

  

  

|-
!colspan=12 style=| Northeast Conference tournament

|-

Awards and honors
Rasheem Dunn
Selected to the 2017–18 NEC men's basketball All-Conference second team

Jalen Jordan
Selected to the 2017–18 NEC men's basketball All-Rookie team
 3x rookie of the week

Chauncey Hawkins

 1x rookie of the week

See also

2017–18 St. Francis Brooklyn Terriers women's basketball team

References

St. Francis Brooklyn Terriers men's basketball seasons
Saint Francis Brooklyn
Saint Francis Brooklyn Terriers men's basketball
Saint Francis Brooklyn Terriers men's basketball